The 1932 Iowa Hawkeyes football team was an American football team that represented the University of Iowa in the 1932 Big Ten Conference football season. In its first season under head coach Ossie Solem, the team compiled a 1–7 record (0–5 against conference opponents), finished in last place in the Big Ten Conference, and was outscored by a total of 171 to 62. The team played its home games at Iowa Stadium in Iowa City, Iowa.

Schedule

References

Iowa
Iowa Hawkeyes football seasons
Iowa Hawkeyes football